Burdon is a surname. Notable people with the surname include:

Surname
 Albert Burdon (1900–1981), British film actor
 Alex Burdon (1879–1943), Australian rugby league and rugby union footballer
 Allan Burdon (1914–2001), Australian politician
 Chris Burdon, sound engineer
 Eric Burdon (born 1941), English singer
 Glen Burdon (born 1954), Canadian ice-hockey player
 Hannah Burdon (1800–1877) English writer of novels
 John Burdon (1866–1933), Governor-General of British Honduras
 John Burdon-Sanderson (1828–1905), English physiologist
 John Shaw Burdon (1826–1907), English missionary to China
 Josh Burdon (born 1992), Australian racing driver 
 Philip Burdon (born 1939), New Zealand politician and lawyer
 Randal Mathews Burdon (1896–1965), New Zealand soldier, sheepfarmer and historian
 Rowland Burdon (died 1838) (1757–1838), English landowner and politician
 Rowland Burdon (Sedgefield MP) (1857–1944), English landowner and politician
 William Burdon (1764–1818) an English academic, mineowner and writer
William Burdon (MP) an English politician

Middle name
 George Burdon McKean (1888–1926), English-Canadian soldier and recipient of the Victoria Cross
 Robert Burdon Stoker (1859–1919), British shipping magnate and politician
 Samuel Burdon Ellis  (1787–1865), British officer in the Royal Marines

See also 
 Burden (surname)
 Burton (disambiguation)
 

English-language surnames